The Shri Guru Charitra is a book based on the life of Shri Nrusiha Saraswati (a.k.a Narasimha Saraswati), written by the 15th-16th century poet Shri Saraswati Gangadhar.

The book is based on the life of Shri Narshimha Saraswati, his philosophy and related stories. The language used is the 14-15th century Marathi. The book is written as a conversation between Siddha (who is a disciple of Shri Narasimha Saraswati) and Naamdharak who is listening to Siddha. 

Guru Charitra is divided into 3 parts: Dhyankand (Knowledge), Karmakand (Work) and Bhaktikand (Devotion). It has 52 Chapters in which, the 53rd chapter is also called as ′Gurucharitra Avatarnika′ which is the summary of the book.

The book is assumed to be written in a village in Karnataka known as Kadaganchi. The writer was Saraswati Gangadhar who was a poet and an extreme vanshaj of Sayandev Sakhare one of the disciples from four favorite disciples of Shri Narasimha Saraswati.

Concept and Narration 
Shri Guru Charitra begins with the story of a character called Naamdharak, who is a personification of a common man, buried with mundane burdens. Naamdharak is troubled with the worldly pains and sets out in search of a Guru for some spiritual guidance. During his journey, he first sees a yogi in his dream. He is wonderstuck to see the same yogi in real when he wakes up. The yogi introduces himself as Siddha, a disciple of Sree Nrusiha saraswati. This is the point where Naamdharam asks Siddha to narrate him the holy Guru Chartira.

At the start of each chapter, Siddha and Naamdharak converse on a question, a thought or on an incident from the past chapter. This is how the chapters progress into either a story or an incident-miracle or biographical anecdotes from the life of a holy Datta incarnation.

Structure 
Shri Guru Charitra contains 53 chapters in total.

 1 to 24 chapters are considered as ‘Gyana Kaand’
 25 to 37 chapters are considered as ‘Karma Kaand’
 38 to 53 chapters are considered as ‘Bhakti Kaand’

Chapter 4 celebrates the birth of Lord Dattatreya. From this chapter on the biography of Datta avatars start.

Chapter 5 to 10 has accounts of Sreepaad Sreevallabh, the first incarnation of Lord Dattatreya. These chapters describe Birth, travels and miracles performed by Sreepaad Sreevallabh. However, Sree Guru Charitra presents a brief account of Sreepaad Sreevallabh. A more comprehensive biography of Sreepaad Sreevallabh is presented in another 17th century text named ‘Sreepaad Sreevallabh Charitra Amrut’

From Chapter 11, Sree Nrusiha saraswati's life is described. Nrusiha Saraswati is born in Karanja and at a very young, he adopts a nomadic life style, travelling to holy places across India. At Kashi Nrusiha accepted Krishna Saraswati as his guru and hence came to be known as Nrusiha Saraswati.

Since chapter 13, Guru Charitra chronicles the life journey of Sree Nrusiha Saraswati. He performs countless miracles, teaches the righteous path of dharma and karma. Chapter 23 describes an important event – establishment of Mutt at Gandgapur.

In chapters 25, 26,27 the essence of Vedas is encapsulated very accurately.

Chapter 31, 32 and 36 elaborate about code of conduct of a Woman, Widow and a Brahmin respectively.

Stories connected to Rudraksh, Bhasma (holy ash), Ashvatt tree, Karma, sins and Pryaschitta are also explained by Sree Guru himself.

Chapter 51 narrates the account of Sree Guru Nrusiha Saraswati ending his avatar.

Chapter 53 is a summary of all the chapters, known as ‘Guru Charitra Avatarnika’

Chronology 
The chronology introduced in the Shri Guru Charitra of Shri Guru Narasimha Saraswati is as follows:

The main events of Sri Narasimha Saraswati's life are given below. Possible years and dates are given according to descriptions of the lunar and stellar events calendar mentioned in the Shri GuruCharitra.
 Sha. 1300 (1378 CE): Birth
 Sha. 1307 (1385 CE): Upanayan 
 Sha. 1308 (1386 CE): Left home
 Sha. 1310 (1388 CE): Took Sanyas
 Sha. 1338 (1416 CE): Arrived back home at Lad-Karanja
 Sha. 1340 (1418 CE): Travelled along the banks of the river Gautami
 Sha. 1342 (1420 CE): Stayed at Parali-Vaijanath
 Sha. 1343 (1421 CE): Stayed at Audumbar (near Bhilawadi)
 Sha. 1344-1356 (1422-1434 CE): Stayed at Narsobawadi (Narsobachi Wadi, Narasimhapur)
 Sha. 1357-1380 (1435-1458 CE): Stayed at Ganagapur (Gandharvapur)
 Sha. 1380 (14 January 1459 CE): Nijanandagaman at Shrishailasm Mountain
The extreme 24 characteristics of Shri Gurumurti Narsahimha saraswati swami maharaj.

Datta Sampradayas 
With time, may learnt saints and seers have formed different traditions based on Datta Bhakti. These Traditions or Sampradayas are commonly known as Datta Sampradayas.

Nath Sampradaya 
The Nath yogis, that metamorphosed into a warrior ascetic group, consider Dattatreya as their theological founder. This group grew and became particularly prominent during the Islamic invasions and Hindu-Muslim wars in South Asia, from about the 14th to 18th century, although the Dattatreya roots of the peaceful Nath yogis go back to about the 10th century. The group was most active in Rajasthan, Gujarat, Maharashtra, Madhya Pradesh, Uttar Pradesh and Nepal. The tradition believes that the legendary Nath sampradaya yogi and Hatha Yoga innovator Gorakshanath was inspired and shaped by Dattatreya. Regional efforts and texts of the Nath tradition such as Yogi sampradaya vishkriti discussed Dattatreya.

Avadhuta Sampradaya 
The nine Narayanas of the Avadhuta sampradaya are attributed to Dattatreya, an idea also found in the Natha sampradaya. A panth started by Pantmaharaj Balekundrikar of Balekundri near Belgavi is related to this.

Dasanami sampradaya and Shakti pithas 
Dattatreya is revered in Dasanami and goddess-oriented Shaktism traditions.

Bhakti traditions 
Dattatetreya's theology emphasizing simple life, kindness to all, questioning the status quo, self pursuit of knowledge and seeking spiritual meaning of life appealed to Bhakti sant-poets of Hinduism such as Tukaram and Eknath, during an era of political and social upheavel caused by Islamic invasion in the Deccan region of India. They reverentially mentioned Dattatreya in their poems. The use of his symbolism was one of the many syncretic themes of this period where the ideas of Vaishnavism and Shaivism holistically fused in popular imagination.

Mahanubhava Sampradaya 
Along with Krishna, the Mahanubhavas consider Dattatreya as their divine inspiration. The Mahanubhava sampradaya, propagated by Sri Chakradhar Swami, has five Krishnas as the incarnations of god, of which Dattatreya is one. The followers of Mahanubhava philosophy revered him as their Adi Guru (the original Guru), as well as the early teachers in their tradition (Chakradhara, Gundama and Changadeva). They worship Dattatreya as single headed with two arms. He has a temple dedicated in Mahur by this tradition.

Shri Guru Charitra tradition 
This tradition follows from Shripad Shrivallabha and Shri Narasimha Saraswati. Two major Datta traditions were started by Shri Swami Samarth of Akkalkot and Shri Vasudevananda Saraswati alias Tembe Swami.

Lal Padris 
another Hindu yogi group from western India with roots in the 10th-century and with ideas similar to Nath and Kanphata sampradaya, traces Dattatreya as the basis of their spiritual ideas.

Around 1550 CE, Dattatreya Yogi taught the Dattatreya philosophy to his disciple Das Gosavi in Marathi. Das Gosavi then taught this philosophy to his two Telugu disciples Gopalbhatt and Sarvaved who studied and translated Das Gosavi's book of Vedantavyavaharsangraha into Telugu language. According to Prof. R. C. Dhere, Dattatreya Yogi and Das Gosavi are the original gurus in the Telugu Dattatreya tradition. Prof. Rao states that Dattatreya Shatakamu was written by Paramanandateertha who is equally important in his contributions to the Telugu tradition of Dattatreya. He was a proponent of Advaita philosophy and dedicated his two epics, Anubhavadarpanamu and Shivadnyanamanjari to Shri Dattatreya. His famous Vivekachintamani book was translated into Kannada by Nijashivagunayogi and Lingayat saint Shanatalingaswami translated this into Marathi.

Places Mentioned in Guru Charitra

Further reading 
Shri Guru Charitra Audio (Marathi & English)
Shri Guru Charitra texts
TransLiteral Foundation made available online transliterated Marathi version
Shri Guru Charitra Android App

External links 

Hindu texts
Indian biographies
15th-century Indian books
16th-century Indian books
Marathi-language literature